Stewartpeckius is a monotypic genus of hubbardiid short-tailed whipscorpions, first described by Reddell & Cokendolpher in 1995. Its single species, Stewartpeckius troglobius is distributed in Jamaica.

References 

Schizomida genera
Monotypic arachnid genera